Hespellia stercorisuis  is a Gram-staining, strictly anaerobic, rod-shaped and non-spore-forming bacterium from the genus of Hespellia which has been isolated from swine manure in Peoria in the United States.

References 

Lachnospiraceae
Bacteria described in 2004